Ken Winey (born September 17, 1962) is a former American football wide receiver who played seven seasons in the Canadian Football League with the Winnipeg Blue Bombers, Edmonton Eskimos and Toronto Argonauts. He played college football at Southern University.

References

External links
Just Sports Stats

Living people
1962 births
Players of American football from Louisiana
American football wide receivers
Canadian football wide receivers
African-American players of American football
African-American players of Canadian football
Southern Jaguars football players
Winnipeg Blue Bombers players
Edmonton Elks players
Toronto Argonauts players
Sportspeople from Lake Charles, Louisiana
21st-century African-American people
20th-century African-American sportspeople